Xanthoepalpus is a genus of flies in the family Tachinidae.

Species
X. bicolor (Williston, 1886)

References

Tachininae
Tachinidae genera
Taxa named by Charles Henry Tyler Townsend